Severínia is a municipality in the state of São Paulo, Brazil. The city has a population of 17,661 inhabitants and an area of 140.4 km².

Severínia belongs to the Mesoregion of São José do Rio Preto.

References

Municipalities in São Paulo (state)